is a retail and wholesale company headquartered in Imizu, Toyama Prefecture, Japan. It is listed on the second tier of the Nagoya Stock Exchange (code 7475). The name stands for "Active Leader with Best Information and Strategy".

History

Due to expansion, the company established an international headquarters as well as district headquarters in September 1977. The company then merged with Hokuriku Hotspar in November that same year.

The Albis retailers' cooperative was formed in April 1992 with the merger of the Hokuriku Super wholesale company and the Tulip Kōrigyō retail chain. The company is divided into two departments—retail and wholesale—and has expanded throughout Toyama, Ishikawa and Fukui Prefectures. The company focus has been to champion the cause of the integrated supermarket, provide information on those working against small chain supermarkets, and offer proactive consulting services and support services.

Albis also has supermarkets under the names Tulip and Hi-Tomato.

References

External links
 Official site

Companies based in Toyama Prefecture
Supermarkets of Japan
1968 establishments in Japan
Retail companies established in 1968